Andrea Sperling (born c. 1968/69) is an independent film producer based in Los Angeles.  The films she has produced include Totally Fucked Up, But I'm a Cheerleader, D.E.B.S. and Itty Bitty Titty Committee and the Sundance Top Prize winning Like Crazy.

Early life and education 
Sperling attended the University of California, Santa Barbara where she took classes under Gregg Araki.  While enrolled, she interned during the summers at Avenue Pictures. She graduated in 1990 with a B.A. in Film History, Theory and Criticism.

Career 
Upon graduation, Sperling's former professor, Gregg Araki, asked her to work with him on The Living End.  The duo would continue their partnership into Araki's next three movies — Totally Fucked Up, The Doom Generation, and Nowhere — which were collective dubbed the "Teen Apocalypse Trilogy".  The trilogy has been characterized as "... teen alienation, hazy sexuality and aggression."

Sperling has been credited with helping to launch the New Queer Cinema movement with her films dating as far back as the 1990s. In 2008, Sperling was introduced to her long-term producing partner, Jonathan Schwartz of Crispy Films, following the recommendation of a sales agent with Creative Artists Agency. Sperling joined Crispy Films, which was subsequently renamed Super Crispy Entertainment.

In 2014, Sperling branched into television, working on the Golden Globe Award-winning series Transparent.  She was elevated to executive producer in 2015.

Awards and honors 
She was inducted into the Academy of Motion Picture Arts and Sciences in 2014.  Sperling was named as a member of the 2008 and 2015 Out100 class by Out.

Personal life 
Sperling is based in Los Angeles, California.  She is a lesbian and was previously married to colleague, Jamie Babbit, with whom she has two children.

Sperling has sat on the board of directors of non-profit organization and film production company POWER UP and was with the organization from the beginning.

Filmography 

 1993: Totally Fucked Up
 1993: Terminal USA
 1995: The Doom Generation
 1996: A Small Domain (short)
 1996: Color of a Brisk and Leaping Day
 1997: Fame Whore
 1997: Nowhere
 1998: Freak Weather
 1998: Desert Blue
 1999: Sleeping Beauties (short)
 1999: But I'm a Cheerleader
 2001: Stuck (short)
 2002: Pumpkin
 2002: Scumrock
 2003: D.E.B.S. (short)
 2003: Hummer (short)
 2004: D.E.B.S.
 2004: A Memoir to My Former Self (short)
 2005: Starcrossed
 2005: Harsh Times
 2005: The Quiet
 2007: If I Had Known I Was a Genius
 2007: Itty Bitty Titty Committee
 2008: Adventures of Power
 2010: Sympathy for Delicious
 2010: Kaboom
 2011: Like Crazy
 2012: Breaking the Girls
 2012: Smashed
 2012: Nobody Walks
 2013: Breathe In
 2014: Imperial Dreams
 2014: All the Wilderness
 2015: Bleeding Heart
 2017: Professor Marston & The Wonder Women

References

External links 
 

American film producers
American lesbians
University of California, Santa Barbara alumni
Living people
Year of birth missing (living people)
American women film producers
LGBT film producers
21st-century American LGBT people
21st-century American women